Noboru Minowa (March 5, 1924 – May 14, 2006) was a member of the House of Representatives of Japan from Hokkaido 1st district. He was from Otaru, Hokkaido, and a graduate of Hokkaido University.

References
マスコミ九条の会（よびかけ人はだれですか）
自衛隊イラク派兵差止北海道訴訟・公式サイト-一次訴状自衛隊イラク派兵差止北海道訴訟・公式サイト-一次訴状
自衛隊イラク派兵差止北海道訴訟・公式サイト-二次訴状
自衛隊イラク派兵差止北海道訴訟・公式サイト-原告・弁護団の活動紹介
自衛隊イラク派兵差止北海道訴訟・公式サイト-コメント
札幌地方裁判所平成19年11月19日判決（平成16(ワ)193号自衛隊員イラク派遣差止等請求事件）（裁判所判例検索システム）。

External links
 経歴.pdf

1924 births
2006 deaths
Politicians from Hokkaido
Members of the House of Representatives (Japan)
Hokkaido University alumni
Japanese surgeons
People from Otaru
20th-century surgeons